Ole Stavad (born 1 June 1949, Ejersted) is a Danish politician representing the Social Democrats.

Stavad was a member of the Danish Parliament from 1980 to 2007.

Stavad served as Tax Minister between 1993-1994 and 1998-2001 and as Minister of Trade and Industry 2000–2001. He was Deputy Chairman of the Danish Social Democratic Party between 1995 and 2000. He served as President of the Nordic Council in 2006.

References 

1949 births
Government ministers of Denmark
Living people
Members of the Folketing
Social Democrats (Denmark) politicians
Danish Tax Ministers